The 1915 Richmond Spiders football team was an American football team that represented Richmond College—now known as the University of Richmond—as a member of the Eastern Virginia Intercollegiate Athletic Association (EVIAA) and the South Atlantic Intercollegiate Athletic Association (SAIAA) during the 1915 college football season. Led by third-year head coach Frank Dobson, Richmond finished the season 4–4–1 overall, 3–2–1 in EVIAA play, and 0–1 against SAIAA opponents.

Schedule

References

Richmond
Richmond
Richmond Spiders football seasons
Richmond Spiders football